Lasiochlamys hurlimannii is a species of flowering plant in the family Salicaceae. It is endemic to New Caledonia.

References

Endemic flora of New Caledonia
hurlimannii
Endangered plants
Taxonomy articles created by Polbot